Will-o'-the-wisp is the light phenomenon traditionally ascribed to ghosts.

Will-o'-the-wisp may also refer to:

Arts and entertainment

Characters
 Will o' the Wisp (comics), a Marvel comic book supervillain physicist
 Will-o'-wisp (Dungeons & Dragons), a malevolent entity in Dungeons & Dragons
 Will o' the wisps, fictional characters in the 2012 animated film Brave

Music 
 "Song Of The Will-o'-the-Wisp" (Canción del fuego fatuo), from El amor brujo, a ballet composed in 1914–15 by Manuel de Falla to a libretto by Gregorio Martínez Sierra
 Recorded by Miles Davis on the 1960 album Sketches of Spain
 Transcendental Etude No. 5 (Liszt), also known as Wills o' the Wisp
 Will O' the Wisp (album), a 1975 album by Leon Russell, and its title track
 Will-O-The-Wisp (Claw Boys Claw album), a 1997 album by Claw Boys Claw
 Will o' the Wisp, a song from Opeth's 2016 album Sorceress
 "Will O' The Wisp", from by Blackmore's Night from the 2015 album All Our Yesterdays
 "Will-o-the-wisp", from the Pet Shop Boys' 2020 album Hotspot

Other arts and entertainment
 Peggy, the Will O' the Wisp, a 1917 film
 Will O' the Wisp (novel), a 1931 novel by Pierre Drieu La Rochelle
 "Will o' the Wisp", a 1999 episode of children's television show So Weird
 Willo the Wisp, a British cartoon series originally produced in 1981
 Ori and the Will of the Wisps, a 2020 video game and sequel to Ori and the Blind Forest

People
 Willie Fleming (born 1939), professional Canadian football player nicknamed "Will o' the Wisp"
 Jeff Hardy (born 1977), American professional wrestler who had the ring name "Willow the Whisp"
 Willie Pep (1922–2006), American boxer nicknamed "Will o' the Wisps"

Other uses
 Ignis Fatuus, a haunted ship attraction at Morey's Piers
SS Will-o'-Wisp a Confederate blockade running steamer
 Will-o'-the-wisp, a variation of Spiderette solitaire game

See also
 Irrlicht (disambiguation), the German name for will-o'-the-wisp